Daniel Ballart Sans (born 17 March 1973 in Barcelona, Catalonia) is a water polo player from Spain. He was a member of the national team that won the gold medal at the 1996 Summer Olympics in Atlanta, Georgia. Four years earlier, when his home town of Barcelona hosted the Games, he was on the side that captured the silver medal. In total Ballart played in four consecutive Summer Olympics for his native country. In the 2019/2020 season he coached the Egyptian giants and champions Gezira Sporting Club in Egypt.

See also
 Spain men's Olympic water polo team records and statistics
 List of Olympic champions in men's water polo
 List of Olympic medalists in water polo (men)
 List of players who have appeared in multiple men's Olympic water polo tournaments
 List of world champions in men's water polo
 List of World Aquatics Championships medalists in water polo

References
 Spanish Olympic Committee

External links
 

1973 births
Living people
Water polo players from Barcelona
Spanish male water polo players
Water polo centre backs
Water polo players at the 1992 Summer Olympics
Water polo players at the 1996 Summer Olympics
Water polo players at the 2000 Summer Olympics
Water polo players at the 2004 Summer Olympics
Medalists at the 1992 Summer Olympics
Medalists at the 1996 Summer Olympics
Olympic gold medalists for Spain in water polo
Olympic silver medalists for Spain in water polo
World Aquatics Championships medalists in water polo
20th-century Spanish people
Spanish expatriate sportspeople in Egypt
Sportsmen from Catalonia
Spanish water polo coaches